Pleun Strik (27 May 1944 – 14 July 2022) was a Dutch professional footballer who played as a defender.

Career
Strik played two matches for the Netherlands national team in the 1970 FIFA World Cup qualification tournament, and he made the Dutch squad for the 1974 FIFA World Cup, although he did not play in the tournament.

Strik played club football with PSV Eindhoven for over eight years in the late 1960s and 1970s, and made a total of 28 appearances for them in UEFA club competitions. This included four games in the 1975–76 European Cup, although he did not play in the semi-final matches against Saint-Étienne.

References

1944 births
2022 deaths
Dutch footballers
Footballers from Rotterdam
Association football defenders
Netherlands international footballers
1974 FIFA World Cup players
Eredivisie players
Eerste Divisie players
Feyenoord players
Go Ahead Eagles players
PSV Eindhoven players
FC Eindhoven players
NEC Nijmegen players
VVV-Venlo players